Finschhafen Urban LLG is a local-level government (LLG) of Morobe Province, Papua New Guinea.

Wards
83. Finschhafen Urban

References

Local-level governments of Morobe Province